Lisiya Ridge (‘Lisiyski Hrebet’ \li-'siy-ski 'hre-bet\) is the ice-covered ridge rising to over 2100 m at the base of Magnier Peninsula, Graham Coast on the west side of Antarctic Peninsula, extending 16 km in northeast-southwest direction between the heads of Leroux Bay and Bigo Bay, and 11 km wide.  Bounded by Comrie Glacier to the south and a tributary to Luke Glacier to the east.  Featuring Mount Bigo at its southwest extremity and Mount Perchot in its central part.  Precipitous, partly ice-free northwest slopes drained by the glaciers Muldava, Nesla and Kolosh.

The ridge is named after the settlement of Lisiya in Southwestern Bulgaria.

Location
British mapping in 1971.

Maps
 British Antarctic Territory.  Scale 1:200000 topographic map. DOS 610 Series, Sheet W 65 64.  Directorate of Overseas Surveys, Tolworth, UK, 1971.
 Antarctic Digital Database (ADD). Scale 1:250000 topographic map of Antarctica. Scientific Committee on Antarctic Research (SCAR), 1993–2016.

Notes

References
 Bulgarian Antarctic Gazetteer. Antarctic Place-names Commission. (details in Bulgarian, basic data in English)
 Lisiya Ridge. SCAR Composite Gazetteer of Antarctica

External links
 Lisiya Ridge. Copernix satellite image

Ridges of Graham Land
Bulgaria and the Antarctic
Graham Coast